Chinny Onwugbenu  is a Nigerian film producer notable for co-producing Road to Yesterday and producing Lionheart. She is the co-founder of The Entertainment Network (TEN), a film production company in Nigeria.

Education 
Chinny attended the Pennsylvania State University and graduated with a degree in Economics in 2006. In 2010, she had her MBA from the UCLA Anderson School of Management.

Career 
In 2015, Chinny co-produced Road to Yesterday, and produced the Netflix acquired Lionheart in 2018. She is also the co-founder of the Entertainment Network (TEN) alongside Genevieve Nnaji, a film production company in Nigeria.

Awards and recognition 
 Best Movie (West Africa) at 2016 AMVCA - Road to Yesterday (film)

References 

Year of birth missing (living people)
Living people
Nigerian film producers
Nigerian women film producers
Pennsylvania State University alumni
UCLA Anderson School of Management alumni
Igbo people